Jaya Sri Amathithuma is a 2019 Sri Lankan political comedy film directed by Nishantha Weerasingha and produced by Janitha Marasinghe for Janitha Films. It stars Sriyantha Mendis and Tennyson Cooray in lead roles along with Kusum Renu and Damitha Abeyratne. The music was composed by Sunil Perera.

Initially scheduled to be released in April, the film was postponed due to the Easter Bombings. Then it was rescheduled to be released on 6 September and then finalized to be screened on 11 September in CEL theaters including Regal, Colombo, Lido, Borella and 50 cinemas island wide.

Plot
Galigamuwa is a minister. The parliamentary general election has arrived and most polls in the province are for Minister Galigamuwa. Just a few seconds before the election results, he knew that he has been defeated. Galigamuwa hospitalized with heart attack What has happened is not that he lost, but that he was elected to the Galigamuwa Parliament by a single vote. Meantime, doctors informed that his heart is gradually dysfunctional. It is informed that a heart transplant should be done immediately whereas Galigamuwa sends his well-heeled disciple to find a heart. Somehow he brought not a human heart but a dog heart. It is transplanted into Galigamuwa and starts to show some doggy behaviors. The film revolves around his dreams and doggy behaviour and political life with several comedy conflicts.

Cast
 Sriyantha Mendis as Minister Galigamuwa
 Tennyson Cooray as Secretary Silva
 Kusum Renu as Godamune madam
 Damitha Abeyratne as Mrs. Galigamuwa
 Gayathri Dias as Samanlatha
 Luxman Amarasekara as Thug
 Ariyasena Gamage as Morris, Madam's secretary
 D.B. Gangodathenna as drunken person
 Jeevan Handunnetti as Jaya, body parts dealer
 Prasad Galappaththi as Doctor
 Chirantha Ranwala as Doctor
 Shiromika Fernando in uncredited role
 Shantha Gallage as Coconut plucker

Songs
The film consist with one song.

References

External links
 
 ඇමතිතුමා ප්‍රමාද වන ලකුණු

2010s Sinhala-language films
2019 films
2010s political comedy films
Sri Lankan comedy films
2019 comedy films